Nagamma is an Indian name based on Serpent goddess Nāga.

 Bala Nagamma (disambiguation), the name of multiple films
 Nayakuralu Nagamma, statesperson and minister to King Nalagama, the ruler of Palanadu in Guntur district

See also 
 Naga (disambiguation)